Norfalia Carabalí Villegas (born 21 January 1964 in Santander de Quilichao, Colombia) is a retired sprinter who competed predominantly in the 400 metres. She represented her native Colombia for most of her career before changing allegiance to Spain in 2000. She competed at three Summer Olympics, in 1988, 1992 and 2000, as well as five World Championships. Her biggest success was reaching the final at the 1993 World Championships in Stuttgart. In addition, she won multiple medals at regional level.

Competition record

1Representing the Americas

Personal bests
Outdoor
100 metres – 11.89 (Castellón 2000)
200 metres – 23.37 (+1.8 m/s) (Maracaibo 1989)
400 metres – 51.17 (Stuttgart 1993)
800 metres – 2:05.23 (Växjö 1986)
Indoor
200 metres – 24.16 (Seville 1991)
400 metres – 54.78 (Seville 1991)
800 metres – 2:09.95 (Seville 1993)

References

1964 births
Living people
Colombian female sprinters
Colombian female middle-distance runners
Spanish female sprinters
Athletes (track and field) at the 1988 Summer Olympics
Athletes (track and field) at the 1992 Summer Olympics
Athletes (track and field) at the 2000 Summer Olympics
Athletes (track and field) at the 1987 Pan American Games
Athletes (track and field) at the 1991 Pan American Games
Athletes (track and field) at the 1995 Pan American Games
Athletes (track and field) at the 1999 Pan American Games
Olympic athletes of Spain
Olympic athletes of Colombia
Pan American Games competitors for Colombia
World Athletics Championships athletes for Colombia
World Athletics Championships athletes for Spain
Sportspeople from Cauca Department
Colombian emigrants to Spain
South American Games silver medalists for Colombia
South American Games medalists in athletics
Competitors at the 1982 Southern Cross Games
Central American and Caribbean Games silver medalists for Colombia
Central American and Caribbean Games bronze medalists for Colombia
Competitors at the 1986 Central American and Caribbean Games
Competitors at the 1990 Central American and Caribbean Games
Competitors at the 1998 Central American and Caribbean Games
Central American and Caribbean Games medalists in athletics
Olympic female sprinters